Eois bitaeniata is a moth in the family Geometridae. It is found in Colombia.

References

Moths described in 1910
Eois
Moths of South America